was a Japanese samurai of the Sengoku period through early Azuchi–Momoyama period, who served the Oda clan.

References

Samurai
1526 births
1585 deaths